Reckling Moraine is a moraine located 8 nautical miles (15 km) west of Reckling Peak, the latter at the head of Mawson Glacier, Victoria Land. The site of the moraine is part of a long, narrow patch of bare ice that extends west from Reckling Peak, from which the moraine is named. The name arose following the collection of meteorites at the moraine by a United States Antarctic Research Program (USARP) field party in the 1979–80 season.
 

Moraines of Antarctica
Landforms of Oates Land